3 of a Kind were a UK garage act, best known for their 2004 number one hit single, "Baby Cakes". Its members were Liana Caruana (a.k.a. Miz Tipzta), Nicholas Gallante (a.k.a. MC Devine) and Marc Portelli. Marc and Liana met the day they recorded "Baby Cakes".

Career

2004: "Baby Cakes"

"Baby Cakes" went straight to number 1 on the UK Singles Chart, and to number 3 on the Irish Singles Chart. It also just crept onto the Eurochart Hot 100 charting at number 91. The song also charted in Belgium, France, Netherlands and Sweden. 3 of a Kind never released a follow-up to "Baby Cakes", making them one-hit wonders in the UK. A potential follow-up track, "Wink One Eye", was put forward as the second single, but was pulled from the new release listings and never re-scheduled.

2014–present
Nicholas Gallante appeared on Never Mind the Buzzcocks in November 2014, as part of the "Identity Parade" round and it was revealed he is now a party planner.

Discography

Singles

References

Musical groups established in 2004
Musical groups disestablished in 2004
British musical trios
UK garage groups
Relentless Records artists